Junji Tanigawa 谷川じゅんじ (born 17 July 1965, Chiba prefecture, Japan) is a Japanese artist, product and spatial designer and the CEO at JTQ Inc.

Career
Tanigawa was the designer of the Japan Media Arts Festival from 2005 to 2008.

Tanigawa was the designer of Japan House Los Angeles, an initiative of the Japanese Ministry of Foreign Affairs.

Publications 
 2012 Junji Tanigawa, The Space Composer Page One Publishing（Singapore）

Awards 
2013 D&AD Award
Display Design Awards  (2002 - 2011)
Display Industry Awards (2008, 2011)

References 
  

Fuji Sankei  Business i. : December 7, 2013 P.10
Energy Link&KITAYAMA&COMPANY P.68 -77 :  September 13, 2013
BRAIN : June 2013 Vol. 635 P.21 
B.R.ONLINE Special Issue ACROSS THE BORDER Vol.2 Junji Tanigawa x Andrea Pompilio January / February 2013

External links 
 Official website

Japanese designers
Product designers
Living people
1965 births
Artists from Chiba Prefecture